Donald Gene Dubbins (June 28, 1928 – August 17, 1991) was an American film, stage and television actor.

Life and career
Born in Brooklyn, New York. Dubbins began his career in 1953, appeariing in the television series The Doctor. He also appeared in the film From Here to Eternity, where he played the uncredited role of the bugler, Pvt. Friday Clark. Perhaps his highest-profile roles came with the western Tribute to a Bad Man and the drama These Wilder Years, both times playing alongside James Cagney. 

Other film credits include The D.I., From the Earth to the Moon, The Illustrated Man, Enchanted Island, Death Wish II, The Caine Mutiny. Later in his career, Dubbins appeared in numerous TV programs including Gunsmoke; The Rifleman; Bonanza; Wanted: Dead or Alive; The Millionaire; Peyton Place; Perry Mason; Petticoat Junction; 77 Sunset Strip; The Twilight Zone; The Guns of Will Sonnett; Dynasty; Voyage to the Bottom of the Sea; Then Came Bronson; Dragnet; Murder, She Wrote; Barnaby Jones; and Hunter. Dubbins's last credit was his role in Death of a Salesman, where he played Willy Loman.

Dubbins died on 17 August 1991 of cancer at the St. Francis Hospital in Greenville, South Carolina, at the age of 63. He was buried in Hillcrest Memorial Gardens.

References

External links 

Rotten Tomatoes profile

1928 births
1991 deaths
People from Brooklyn
Male actors from New York (state)
Deaths from cancer in South Carolina
American male film actors
American male television actors
American male stage actors
20th-century American male actors
Western (genre) television actors